Estadio Municipal Juan Rojas is a rugby stadium in Almería, Spain. It was initially used as the stadium of football club AD Almería as well as UD Almería matches until it was replaced by Estadio de los Juegos Mediterráneos in 2004. The capacity of the stadium is 13,468 spectators.

In 2017, the stadium was partially demolished to expand the pitch, in order to be able to host the rugby union matches of the local team UR Almería. It was finally re-inaugurated on 8 September 2018.

References

External links
Stadium history
Estadios de España 

UD Almería
Buildings and structures in Almería
Football venues in Andalusia
Sports venues completed in 1976
Rugby union stadiums in Spain